Moygownagh GAA is a Gaelic football club in County Mayo.

See also
 Moygownagh

External links
 Moygownagh.ie - Moygownagh GAA Club - a short history

Gaelic football clubs in County Mayo
Gaelic games clubs in County Mayo